The 2007 season was the Hawthorn Football Club's 83rd season in the Australian Football League and 106th overall.

2006 Draft

Fixture

NAB Cup

Premiership Season

Finals Series

Ladder

References

Hawthorn Football Club Season, 2007
Hawthorn Football Club seasons
Hawthorn Football Club Season, 2007